Dolliver can refer to:
 Jonathan P. Dolliver, Iowa senator
 Dolliver, Iowa